= 1993 Liechtenstein public buildings referendum =

- 7 March 1993
- Referendum on the construction of a new Landtag building and some other buildings

Results
Choice	Votes	%
Yes	1,682	20.39%
No	6,568	79.61%
Valid votes	8,250	98.92%
Invalid or blank votes	90	1.08%
Total votes	8,340	100.00%
Registered voters/turnout	14,009	59.53%

A referendum on the construction of public buildings was held in Liechtenstein on 7 March 1993. Voters were asked whether they approved of the construction of a new main building and some annexes for the Liechtenstein parliament, Landtag. The proposal was rejected by 79.6% of voters.

== Results ==
Choice	Votes	%
For	1,682	20.4
Against	6,568	79.6
Invalid/blank votes	92	–
Total	8,342	100
Registered voters/turnout	14,009	59.5
Source: Nohlen & Stöver
